Paulo Nawalu, spelt also as Paula Nawalu  (born October 18, 1959 in Lautoka) is a former rugby union player. He played as a scrum-half.

Career
His first international match was against Tonga, at Suva, on June 8, 1983. He was also part of the 1987 Rugby World Cup roster, as well of the South Pacific Barbarians during their 1987 tour in South Africa. Later, Nawalu played for the Japan national rugby sevens team, with which he played the 1993 Rugby World Cup Sevens. Nawalu was the first Fijian player to play in a Japanese team, when he played for Hino Motors.

Coaching career
He trained the Japan national rugby sevens team during the 1997 and the 2001 Rugby World Cup Sevens. Currently, since 2015, he is coaching Karada  Factory A.P. Pirates, a Japanese women's rugby sevens team.

Notes

External links

1958 births
Living people
Sportspeople from Lautoka
Fijian rugby sevens players
Fijian rugby union coaches
Fijian rugby union players
Japanese rugby sevens players
I-Taukei Fijian people
Fijian expatriates in Japan
Rugby union fly-halves
Fiji international rugby union players
Japan international rugby sevens players